KYKS (105.1 FM) is a terrestrial radio station serving the Lufkin/Nacogdoches area with a  country music format. It is under currently under ownership of Townsquare Media.

History
KYKS was first proposed by K.M. Bardield, under the licensee name of Lufkin Broadcasting Corporation in 1972. The facility was proposed to operate with 100 kilowatts non-directional, at 490 meters above average terrain, from a transmission site on Farm to Market Road 2021, 6.5 miles northwest of Lufkin. The specifications for the site gave it the largest FM coverage area in the Lufkin-Nacogdoches area at the time.

The facility was built and received an initial License to Cover on September 29, 1976 as KLUF.

KLUF changed its callsign to the current KYKS on January 1, 1980, formatted as country music station "Kicks 105". The format and branding are currently the longest running continuous FM operation in the Lufkin-Nacogdoches area, only eclipsed by AM station KRBA, which began operations in 1938, and has held a Country format since the 1970s.

External links
Kicks 105 - Official Site

YKS
Country radio stations in the United States
Radio stations established in 1980
Townsquare Media radio stations